Katinka Larsen (9 November 1905 – August 1999) was a female diver who competed for England.

Diving career
Larsen competed for England in the 3 Metres Springboard at the 1934 British Empire Games in London. She won a silver medal in the 3 Metres Springboard Diving at the 1934 European Aquatics Championships. She also competed at the 1936 Summer Olympics, finishing 13th on the 3 metre springboard.

Larsen was described in 1937 as being "one of the finest divers in the world".

Personal life
She married Edward F W Tinsley in March 1937 at Finchley, with the wedding cake decorated with a miniature diving board.

References

External links
 

1905 births
1999 deaths
English female divers
Divers at the 1934 British Empire Games
Olympic divers of Great Britain
Divers at the 1936 Summer Olympics
Commonwealth Games competitors for England